Tekka Raja Badsha ;    was a  Bengali television comedy drama that   premiered on 16 July 2018 and  airs on the Bengali television channel titled Star Jalsha. It  streams on the digital platform Hotstar It aired on the Bengali television channel called STAR Jalsha. The show  starred Yuvraj Chowdhury (previously starred in Colors Bangla's show Roopkatha and later starred in Zee Bangla's Trinayani), Somraj Maity (previously starred in Star Jalsha's Thik Jeno Love Story, Colors Bangla's Gouridan, Zee Bangla's Ei Chheleta Bhelbheleta and then starred in Star Jalsha's Kunjochhaya and Sun Bangla's Jiyon Kathi), Soumick Saha (who later acted in Zee Bangla's Hriday Haran B.A Pass), Tonni Laha Roy (of Zee Bangla's Tumi Robe Nirobe, Baksho Bodol and Mithai (currently working in) fame and Colors Bangla's Bene Bou fame), Moushumi Priya Debanth (previously acted in Star Jalsha's Potol Kumar Gaanwala and Colors Bangla's Roopkatha and then in Sun Bangla's Beder Meye Jyostna) and Debachandrima Singha Roy (previously acted in Colors Bangla's Kajallata and now working in Star Jalsha's Sanjher Baati) in lead roles. The show is based on the Amitabh Bachchan-Rishi Kappor starrer 1977 film Amar Akbar Anthony  which was directed by Manmohan Desai. The show is written by Snehasish Chakroborty known for Khokababu, Jarowar Jhumko, Tumi Robe Nirobe, and Rakhi Bandhan. The show replaced the daily soap opera Sanyashi Raja.

Plot
As the paths of three seemingly unrelated young men get tangled by a twist of circumstances – a roller coaster of cat and mouse, and bonding and self-discovery ensue causing utter confusion and chaos with hilarious consequences.

Raja is a fabulous singer but a simple village boy. At times, he is stupid but honest and kind hearted. His naive honesty always lead him  to trouble. Badsha, on the other hand, is a righteous and honest police officer. He hates criminals and crimes. Fate plays its trick when Raja meets Tekka the thief. Though Tekka possesses a golden heart, he is a burglar. Tekka, Raja and Badsha seem to be connected by some mystery- mystery that is hidden in their past. This is the story about Tekka, Raja, Badsha and their journey.

Cast
Yuvraj Chowdhury as Tekka, Darjeeling's love interest and later husband
Somraj Maity as Raja, Aradhya's love interest and later husband 
Soumik Saha as Badsha, Teer's love interest and later husband
Moushumi Debnath as Darjeeling, Tekka's love interest and later wife
Debachandrima Singha Roy as Aradhya, Raja's love interest and later wife
Tonni Laha Roy as Teer/Gurumaa, Badsha's love interest and later wife
Gourav Ghoshal as Yug/Drug Dealer
Bimal Chakraborty as Dinesh
Moumita Chakrobarty as Ratri
Kotha Chakroborty as Aradhya 's Sister
Rimjhim Rims as Aradhya 's Sister
Sonali Chatterjee as Yug's Mother

References

Bengali-language television programming in India
2018 Indian television series debuts
2019 Indian television series endings
Indian drama television series
Indian comedy television series
Indian romance television series
Star Jalsha original programming